All Souls Weekend is an event in Tucson, Arizona. It draws on Mesoamerican, Spanish Roman Catholic, and Mexican rituals, incorporating many diverse cultural traditions with the common goal of honoring and remembering the deceased.

Background
All Souls Weekend is more commonly known as All Souls Procession weekend and is derived from the All Souls Procession, an event first initiated and organized in 1990 by Tucson artist Susan Kay Johnson to "express her sorrow" over the recent death of her father and to initiate an artistic ritual in honor of the dead in Tucson. Johnson had studied art therapy based in part on the work of Swiss psychoanalyst Carl Jung including his study of rituals in cultures around the world. After her father died, Johnson planned and invited other artists to participate in a three-day ritual, which lasted from Halloween through All Saints Day and ended on All Souls Day. The ritual took place in public and private spaces in downtown Tucson, and involved art objects Johnson created for the event. These objects included "a giant fabric-and-wire cocoon big enough to hold 15 masked performers who snaked through the neighborhood and emerged as butterflies to dance to the cue of a flute player." By 1991, public interest the ritual led Johnson and other artists to apply for a grant from the Tucson Partnership in order to involve the Tucson community in the event, through free public workshops in art and music followed by a large procession. One of the artists listed on the grant application, Mykl Wells, has reported that he helped Johnson write the 1991 grant application, on which his name is spelled "Michael Wells." Wells has reported that he helped inspire Johnson's initial planning of the 1990 All Souls Procession when he told Johnson about Día de los Muertos rituals he had witnessed in Guanajuato, Mexico in the 1980s.

Controversy 
Organizers of All Souls Weekend have made explicit efforts to present the All Souls Procession and associated events as inclusive of but distinct in origin from Día de los Muertos, partly in response to charges of cultural appropriation by academic critics who have charged that its organizers and participants have primarily been Anglo-Americans. Similar charges have been directed at the Day of the Dead parade in the Mission District in San Francisco. However, with All Souls Weekend events now bringing together over 100,000 people of varying backgrounds in a public celebration in downtown Tucson, the organizers influence but do not control the traditions participants choose to represent and honor in the event. Each year thousands of participants in All Souls Weekend activities choose to wear calavera-style makeup and objects, familiar to many in Tucson due to the city's location 50 miles from the US-Mexico border. After the Spanish conquest of middle America, ancient Mesoamerican rituals merged with Roman Catholic tradition along with modern cultural interests in the Americas, yielding the holiday known today as Día de los Muertos in Spanish or Day of the Dead in English. At least one writer has argued that All Soul’s Weekend in Tucson represents a further step in the evolution of precolonial Mesoamerican rituals and Day of the Dead.  Though there is evidence the All Souls Procession was directly inspired by the history of Day of the Dead, the organizers of the All Soul’s Weekend emphasize that the event includes and encourages all forms of individual expression, drawing from many cultures, religions, and rituals. The mission of the weekend’s primary organizing body, Many Mouths One Stomach (MMOS), includes the perspective that death is a universal experience, uniting deceased loved ones with the living. MMOS intends All Soul’s Weekend to serve as an opportunity to approach death in a safe social setting.

All Soul's Procession
All Soul’s Weekend culminates with its largest event, a parade called the All Soul’s Procession. According to MMOS, “The All Souls Procession is perhaps one of the most important, inclusive and authentic public ceremonies in North America today.” Participants often dress up, wear masks, paint their faces, create intricate artistic installations, and tow altars, also engaging in numerous other forms of expression in remembrance of the deceased. The deceased may include family, friends, pets, endangered species, fallen heroes, victims of war, or any other group that an individual feels deserving of remembrance. The procession is a forum for the community to engage in open authentic expression of grief, loss, joy, and celebration. The procession is led by a large steel container called The Urn in which procession attendees are invited to place prayers, photographs, and other remembrances of lost loved ones. At the end of the procession, The Urn is set on fire. Burning of The Urn serves the purpose of uniting individual remembrances into a one cathartic communal expression of both grief and celebration honoring lost loved ones.

Attendance and Sponsorship
Attendance to, and participation in, All Soul’s Weekend is free to the public. The event itself includes no sponsor advertising. MMOS is a non-profit organization funded exclusively by donations. All Soul’s Weekend costs approximately one dollar per attendee. The total cost for the 2014 procession was $109,850. MMOS expresses pride in the community based nature of All Soul’s Weekend and does not intend to seek corporate sponsorship as, “that funding is likely to come with requirements and obligations we are reluctant to take on”. Of all participants in the Procession, an average of 3,000 donate while 97,000 do not. Tax deductible donations from individuals and groups, including businesses and private organizations, may be made to MMOS in support of All Soul’s Weekend.

References

External links
 All Souls Procession
 

Festivals in Tucson, Arizona
November events
Observances honoring the dead